Midnight Mass is an American gothic supernatural horror streaming television miniseries created and directed by Mike Flanagan and starring Zach Gilford, Kate Siegel, Hamish Linklater, Samantha Sloyan, Rahul Kohli, Kristin Lehman, and Henry Thomas. The Maddy Young fictional novel, Midnight Mass, is featured in Flanagan's and Siegel's 2016 American slasher film Hush. The plot centers on an impoverished island community that experiences supernatural events after the arrival of a mysterious priest.

It was released on Netflix on September 24, 2021, and received positive reviews.

Premise
A young man returns to his isolated hometown on Crockett Island, hoping to rebuild his life after serving four years in prison for killing someone in a drunk-driving incident. He arrives at the same time as a mysterious, charismatic young priest who begins to revitalise the town's flagging faith. However, the community's divisions are soon exacerbated by the priest's deeds while mysterious events befall the small town.

Cast and characters
The cast for Midnight Mass consists of:

Main
 Zach Gilford as Riley Flynn, a former venture capitalist who returns to his hometown of Crockett Island after spending four years in prison for killing a woman in a drunk driving accident.
 Hamish Linklater as Father Paul Hill, the enigmatic new priest at St. Patrick's Church, who arrives to temporarily replace the aging Monsignor Pruitt.
 Kate Siegel as Erin Greene, Riley's childhood sweetheart, now a schoolteacher on Crockett Island and expecting a child. Siegel previously starred in Flanagan's 2016 film Hush (also co-written by Siegel) as Madison "Maddie" Young, presented within the film as the author of Midnight Mass.
 Kristin Lehman as Annie Flynn, Riley's devout, forgiving mother.
 Samantha Sloyan as Bev Keane, a zealous, overbearing, and influential member of the church.
 Igby Rigney as Warren Flynn, Riley's teenage brother who serves as an altar boy at the church.
 Rahul Kohli as Sheriff Hassan, Crockett Island's Muslim sheriff, who finds it difficult to fit in with the town's predominantly Catholic population.
 Annarah Cymone as Leeza Scarborough, the mayor's devout daughter who uses a wheelchair following an injury.
 Annabeth Gish as Dr. Sarah Gunning, the town's local doctor, and Erin's close friend.
 Alex Essoe as Mildred Gunning, Sarah's aging mother who has dementia.
 Rahul Abburi as Ali Hassan, the sheriff's son and friend of Warren and Ooker.
 Matt Biedel as Sturge, the island handyman.
 Michael Trucco as Wade Scarborough, the mayor of Crockett Island.
 Crystal Balint as Dolly Scarborough, Wade's wife, and Leeza's mother.
 Louis Oliver as Ooker, Warren and Ali's friend who also serves as an altar boy at the church.
 Henry Thomas as Ed Flynn, Riley's father who works as a fisherman and is reluctant to welcome his son home.

Recurring
 Robert Longstreet as Joe Collie, the town drunk
 Carla Gugino as Judge
 Quinton Boisclair as The Angel
 Ebony Booth as Tara-Beth, the teenage girl killed by Riley in a drunk driving accident
 John C. McDonald as Bowl, a local drug dealer

Episodes
The title of each episode is a book in the Bible. Each episode contains a scene referring to the  Biblical book.

Development

Production 
Series creator Mike Flanagan described Midnight Mass as a passion project, one that was "deeply personal" and dealt intimately with Flanagan's upbringing in the Catholic Church, and his eventual sobriety and atheism. He conceived the idea first as a novel, then as a film script, then as a television series that he unsuccessfully pitched to various production companies (including its eventual distributor Netflix) in 2014. Flanagan and Kate Siegel then adapted Midnight Mass as a story within a story in their 2016 film Hush (2016), in which Midnight Mass is presented as the most popular book by Siegel's character, Maddie Young, with Flanagan then planting the Hush prop book bearing the Midnight Mass title as an Easter egg in his 2017 film Gerald's Game, as a means of "keeping the idea alive over the years". Prior to the series' production, Flanagan created the critically acclaimed horror series The Haunting of Hill House for Netflix, which released in 2018, as well as its 2020 follow-up The Haunting of Bly Manor.

On July 1, 2019, Netflix announced that Midnight Mass would be a seven-episode miniseries, with Flanagan serving as its writer, director and executive producer. In February 2020, Zach Gilford, Kate Siegel and Hamish Linklater were announced as lead roles for the series.

Production was originally scheduled to commence in March 2020, but was delayed by the COVID-19 pandemic. Midnight Mass entered production on August 17, 2020, in Vancouver, British Columbia and concluded on December 15, 2020. Production built the town set at Garry Point Park, a seaside public area outside Vancouver, which stood in for Crockett Island.

Music 

The soundtrack for Midnight Mass was released in September 2021. The music for the series was scored by The Newton Brothers, Andy Grush and Taylor Newton Stewart, who have worked with series creator Mike Flanagan on each of his projects since his 2013 film Oculus. The soundtrack features reimagined Christian hymns, along with original pieces from The Newton Brothers.

Release
Midnight Mass was released on Netflix on September 24, 2021.

Reception

Critical response

The review aggregator website Rotten Tomatoes reports an 87% approval rating with an average rating of 8.10/10, based on 97 critic reviews. The website's critics consensus reads, "An ambitious meditation on grief and faith that is as gorgeous as it is unsettling, Midnight Masss slow boil is a triumph of terror that will leave viewers shaking – and thinking – long after the credits roll." Metacritic gave the series a weighted average score of 75 out of 100 based on 23 reviews, indicating "generally favorable reviews".

Critics praised Flanagan's direction, the performances, and the series' unique approach to the vampire genre. Kristen Baldwin of Entertainment Weekly gave the series an "A−" grade and wrote that it "isn't perfect, but it is a keenly affecting, beautifully acted reflection on death, faith, guilt, addiction, and the power of free will." Judy Berman of Time gave it a very positive review, calling it Flanagan's best series yet and praised the performances of Zach Gilford, Kate Siegel and especially Hamish Linklater. Jen Chaney of Vulture called Linklater's performance "phenomenal" and believed he elevated the series to "moments of greatness," writing: "he speaks as if he's discovering his way through every sentence and wants you to come with him." David Fear of Rolling Stone wrote, "the three-layers-deep work that Linklater is doing over these seven episodes is extraordinary." Fear also praised Flanagan's directing, stating that "It’s the way that [he] carefully sets everything into place in anticipation of a bigger-picture nightmare that makes the payoffs so satisfying." Richard Roeper of the Chicago Sun-Times called the series "the best Stephen King story Stephen King never wrote" and stated, "even though this is an original work from Flanagan, it feels like a high-level adaptation of a particularly haunting King novel."

The series' writing and pace drew more mixed responses, with frequent criticism directed at the script's perceived overabundance of monologues. Jack Seale of The Guardian gave the series three out of five stars, praising Flanagan's filmmaking, but criticizing the series for its "bloated dialogue" stating that "When the end comes at last, there is a lot of fire and viscera, but no rapture." Brian Tallerico of RogerEbert.com gave the series two and a half stars out of four, further criticizing the dialogue and religious themes, stating that the series "can be a little exhausting in its preachiness." Tallerico felt that the series' emphasis on philosophical examination came at the expense of its horror elements, writing, "most of the lengthy conversations are well-scripted, engaging enough in their dialogue, but they also drain a lot of the momentum from the piece." He also criticized the series' visual effects as "generally inferior to both Haunting projects," stating "Flanagan has always worked better with shadows in the dark than when he has to reveal them."

The show's creators insisted that the series was not anti-religious or anti-Catholic. A Catholic priest who reviewed the show said its depiction of how religion treats sin was accurate, but the series showed a poor understanding of how religion treats afterlife, while Premier Christianity states that the show "contains some of the fairest treatments of Christian characters I’ve seen on screen" and "also has a prophetic message to the Church."

Kohli's character has received praise from Muslim viewers, many citing him as a rare example of positive, accurate Muslim representation. The scene where he argues about religious texts in public schools has been also praised as an accurate reading of a Muslim perspective on Jesus. Kohli said in Michael Rosenbaum's podcast Inside of You that the role was his most difficult. Kohli is "not Muslim, not American, not a dad, and not forty," and thus had a hard time in the role.

Accolades

References

External links

 
 

2021 American television series debuts
2021 American television series endings
2020s American drama television miniseries
2020s American horror television series
2020s American supernatural television series
American horror fiction television series
English-language Netflix original programming
Horror drama television series
Television series set on fictional islands
Television shows filmed in Vancouver
Television productions postponed due to the COVID-19 pandemic
Vampires in television